Romeu Zema Airport  is the airport serving Araxá, Minas Gerais, Brazil. It is named after Romeu Zema, a local entrepreneur.

Airlines and destinations

Access

See also

List of airports in Brazil

References

External links

Airports in Minas Gerais